Monique Morrow is an American  telecommunications engineer who was CTO Consulting Engineer at Cisco Systems between 2012 and 2016, and is president and co-founder of Humanized Internet, a non profit organization active in protecting the digital identities of under-represented populations.

Education 
Morrow holds a master's degree in Telecommunications Management from Golden Gate University, and MBA from City University of Seattle (Zurich, Switzerland Program) and a BA in French from San Jose University. She holds a Graduate Certificate in Information Systems from the University of Southern California and a Diploma of Higher Studies from the University of Paris Sorbonne.

Career 
Morrow began her career in 1982 as a network engineer at Advanced Micro Devices. From 1990 to 1994, she worked as a network engineer at Ascom Hasler. From 1994 to 2000, she was a network design engineer at Swisscom. She joined CiscoSystems  CTO and Evangelist.

Since 2017, Morrow is the President and co-founder of a non-profit organization, The Humanized Internet, that focuses on providing digital identity for those groups that are most underserved. She is also a partner at Sparklabs Accelerator for Cybersecurity and Blockchain where she advises tech companies and organizations.

Awards 
 The World's Top 50 Women in Tech 2018
 Business Worldwide Magazine's 2016 Visionary of the Year (Technology, Social Change and Ethics) and 2016 Social Media Champion of the Year.
 Top 100 Chief Information Officer for 2016
 Top Women in Cloud Innovations Award 2016
 Social Media Presence of the Year 2016
 10 Women in Networking/Communications You Should Know
 Top 10 Influential IT Women in Europe
 2015 Women of M2M/IoT
 2014 GEM-TECH Award

References 

Living people
Cisco people
Golden Gate University alumni
Year of birth missing (living people)